Hrebeniv is a Carpathian village in Stryi Raion, Lviv Oblast of Western Ukraine. It belongs to Skole urban hromada, one of the hromadas of Ukraine.
The population of the village is about 593 people. Local government is administered by Hrebenivska village council.

Geography 

History and Attractions 
For the first time the village is mentioned in the studies of the Polish historian and ethnographer Jabłonowski  in 1589. Although in these areas by archaeologists found the remains of many things and weapons from the 11th-12th centuries.
The tomb of Prince Svyatoslav Vladimirovich (982 – 1015)  is near Hrebeniv village, on the right bank of the Opir River.
The village has two architectural monuments of local importance of Stryi Raion:
 Church of the Annunciation of the Blessed Virgin Mary (wooden) 1928 (N- 2911 / 1M).
 The bell tower of the church of the Annunciation of the Blessed Virgin Mary 1928 (N- 2911 / 2M).

Until 18 July 2020, Hrebeniv belonged to Skole Raion. The raion was abolished in July 2020 as part of the administrative reform of Ukraine, which reduced the number of raions of Lviv Oblast to seven. The area of Skole Raion was merged into Stryi Raion.

References

External links 
  Життя Карпатського Народу/Гребенів, село 
 Населенні пункти Сколівського району  -  Гребенів 
 weather.in.ua/Hrebeniv (Lviv region)
 Гребенів/Церква Благовіщення Пр. Богородиці 1928 

Villages in Stryi Raion